The Men's 50 metre rifle prone event at the 2008 Olympic Games took place on August 15 at the Beijing Shooting Range Hall.

The event consisted of two rounds: a qualifier and a final. In the qualifier, each shooter fired 60 shots with a .22 Long Rifle at 50 metres distance from the prone position. Scores for each shot were in increments of 1, with a maximum score of 10.

The top 8 shooters in the qualifying round moved on to the final round. There, they fired an additional 10 shots. These shots scored in increments of .1, with a maximum score of 10.9. The total score from all 70 shots was used to determine final ranking.

Records
The existing world and Olympic records were as follows.

Qualification round

Q Qualified for final

Final

Shooting at the 2008 Summer Olympics
Men's 050m prone 2008
Men's events at the 2008 Summer Olympics